IFK Timrå is a Swedish football club located in Timrå in Västernorrland County.

Background
Idrottsföreningen Kamraterna Timrå was formed on 9 January 1978 as a spin-off from Timra IK with the emphasis from an early stage on youth development.  IFK Timra is now one of Norrland's largest football clubs, with around 1,200 members, of whom about 600 are active participants. The Youth Section currently has approximately 500 active members who are catered for by around 30 teams, from the age of 8 to junior level. The club is supported by Timrå municipality and local companies and many volunteer leaders and parents who ensure the club and its youth activities are effective.

Since their foundation IFK Timrå has participated mainly in the middle divisions of the Swedish football league system.  In 2010 the club played in Division 3 Mellersta Norrland, which is the fifth tier of Swedish football, but finished in a relegation position and therefore will play in Division 4 in 2011. In 2007 they reached Division 1 Norra but their stay at this level was brief and then a downward decline set in.  They play their home matches at the Timrå IP in Timrå. The club also makes use of grass pitches at Fagervik.

IFK Timrå are affiliated to the Medelpads Fotbollförbund.

The club arranges an annual football tournament, the Mid Nordic Cup, which is played at the Fagervik playing fields in Timrå.

In October 2001, the club was awarded the Gunnar Nordahl Scholarship.

Season to season

Attendances

In recent seasons IFK Timrå have had the following average attendances:

The attendance record was set on 5 May 2004 when 2,706 spectators attended the Swedish Cup match with Djurgårdens IF.

Footnotes

External links
 IFK Timrå – Official website
 IFK Timrå Facebook

Sport in Timrå
Football clubs in Västernorrland County
Association football clubs established in 1978
1978 establishments in Sweden
Idrottsföreningen Kamraterna